Yuri Sardarov, aka Yuriy Sardarov, (born January 28, 1988) is an American actor and producer. He has done extensive work in the theater. He starred on NBC's Chicago Fire until season 8.

Early life
Yuri Sardarov is half-Georgian and half-Armenian; he moved to the United States at age two as a refugee. His parents and grandparents were musicians. Sardarov was named after his grandfather, with whom he is very close, and they have matching Cyrillic tattoos. Because his grandfather was named "Yuri," Sardarov began to spell his name with an extra "y" at the end to differentiate himself. He has a brother, Nick, who is eleven years younger. Sardarov attended Glenbrook North High School, near Chicago, starting his junior year. He graduated in 2006. In 2010 he graduated with a BFA in Theatre Performance at the University of Michigan School of Music, Theatre & Dance where he was in a fraternity.

Personal life
He divides his time between Los Angeles and Chicago. During filming for Chicago Fire, he lived with his costars Joe Minoso and Charlie Barnett. He has a partner, Madeleine. Sardarov enjoys comedy and took classes at The Second City during his free time in Chicago.

Filmography
Television

Films

Shorts

References

External links

1988 births
Living people
American people of Georgian (country) descent
American people of Armenian descent
Soviet emigrants to the United States
Male actors from Chicago
University of Michigan School of Music, Theatre & Dance alumni
American male television actors
21st-century American male actors
Place of birth missing (living people)
Glenbrook North High School alumni